Eduardo Rueda (born 23 October 1972) is a Mexican diver. He competed in two events at the 2000 Summer Olympics.

References

External links
 

1972 births
Living people
Mexican male divers
Olympic divers of Mexico
Divers at the 2000 Summer Olympics
Divers from Mexico City
Pan American Games bronze medalists for Mexico
Medalists at the 1999 Pan American Games
Divers at the 1999 Pan American Games
Pan American Games medalists in diving
21st-century Mexican people
20th-century Mexican people